The 1950 All-Southern Conference football team consists of American football players chosen by the Associated Press (AP) for the All-Southern Conference football team for the 1950 college football season.

All-Southern Conference selections

Backs
 Gil Bocetti, Washington & Lee (AP-1)
 Billy Cox, Duke (AP-1)
 Steve Wadiak, South Carolina (AP-1)
 Fred Cone, Clemson (AP-1)

Ends
 Blaine Earon, Duke (AP-1)
 Elmer Wingate, Maryland (AP-1)

Tackles
 Elmer Costa, North Carolina State (AP-1)

Guards
 Bob Ward, Maryland (AP-1)
 Joe Dudeck, North Carolina (AP-1)

Centers
 Irv Holdash, North Carolina (AP-1)

Key
AP = Associated Press

See also
1950 College Football All-America Team

References

All-Southern Conference football team
All-Southern Conference football teams